A mud cookie, Galette or bonbon tè in Haitian Creole, is a food that is eaten in Haiti, particularly during pregnancy. They can be found in slums like Cité Soleil. Dirt is collected from the nation's central plateau, near the town of Hinche, and trucked over to the market (e.g. La Saline market) where women purchase it. It is processed into cookies in shanty towns such as Fort Dimanche. First, the dirt is strained to remove rocks and clumps. Then, the dirt is mixed with salt and vegetable shortening or fat. Next, it is formed into flat discs. Then, it is dried in the sun. The finished product is transported in buckets and is sold in the market or on the streets.

Due to their mineral content, mud cookies were traditionally used as a dietary supplement for pregnant women and children. Haitians believe they contain calcium which could be used as an antacid and for nutrition, but this is disputed by doctors who warn of tooth decay, constipation, and worse. The production cost is cheap; the dirt to make one hundred cookies was five US dollars in 2008 (about 5 cents apiece) even after increasing by $1.50 since 2007. It is also seen as a way to stave off starvation. This is especially true in times where there is a rise in global food prices like in 2008.

The taste has been described as a smooth consistency that immediately dries the mouth with a pungent aftertaste of dirt that lingers for hours.

See also
Geophagia
Mud pie

References

Hunger
Haitian cuisine